Prospect Hill, also known as Prospect and Gray's Folly, is a historic home near Fincastle, Botetourt County, Virginia. Built in 1837–1838, it is a -story, single-pile, wood frame I-house dwelling in the Federal style, with a one-story brick kitchen wing. It is sheathed in flush boarding and covered by a pedimented gable roof. The front facade features a two-level pedimented portico on slender Tuscan order columns.

It was listed on the National Register of Historic Places in 1979.

References

Houses on the National Register of Historic Places in Virginia
Federal architecture in Virginia
Houses completed in 1838
Houses in Botetourt County, Virginia
National Register of Historic Places in Botetourt County, Virginia